The International Conference on Machine Learning (ICML) is the leading international academic conference in machine learning. Along with NeurIPS and ICLR, it is one of the three primary conferences of high impact in machine learning and artificial intelligence research. It is supported by the (IMLS). Precise dates vary year to year, but paper submissions are generally due at the end of January, and the conference is generally held the following July. The first ICML was held 1980 in Pittsburgh.

Locations 
  ICML 2026 Seoul, South Korea
  ICML 2025 Vancouver, Canada
  ICML 2024 Vienna, Austria
  ICML 2023 Honolulu, Hawaii, United States
  ICML 2022 Baltimore, Maryland, United States
  ICML 2021 Vienna, Austria (virtual conference)
  ICML 2020 Vienna, Austria (virtual conference)
  ICML 2019 Los Angeles, United States
  ICML 2018 Stockholm, Sweden
  ICML 2017 Sydney, Australia
  ICML 2016 New York City, United States
  ICML 2015 Lille, France
  ICML 2014 Beijing, China
  ICML 2013 Atlanta, United States
  ICML 2012 Edinburgh, Great Britain
  ICML 2011 Bellevue, United States
  ICML 2010 Haifa, Israel
  ICML 2009 Montréal, Canada
  ICML 2008 Helsinki, Finland
  ICML 2007 Corvallis, Oregon, United States
  ICML 2006 Pittsburgh, Pennsylvania, United States
  ICML 2005 Bonn, Germany
  ICML 2004 Banff, Canada
  ICML 2003 Washington DC, United States
  ICML 2002 Sydney, Australia
  ICML 2001 Williamstown, Massachusetts, United States
  ICML 2000 Stanford, California, United States
  ICML 1999 Bled, Slovenia
  ICML 1998 Madison, United States
  ICML 1997 Nashville, United States
  ICML 1996 Bari, Italy
  ICML 1995 Tahoe City, United States
  ICML 1994 New Brunswick, United States
  ICML 1993 Amherst, United States
  ICML 1992 Aberdeen, Great Britain
  ICML 1991 Evanston, United States
  ICML 1990 Austin, United States
  ICML 1989 Ithaca, United States
  ICML 1988 Ann Arbor, United States
  ICML 1987 Irvine, United States
  ICML 1985 Skytop, United States
  ICML 1983 Monticello, United States
  ICML 1980 Pittsburgh, United States

See also 
 ICLR
 Journal of Machine Learning Research
 Machine Learning (journal)
 NeurIPS

References

External links 
 Official site

Artificial intelligence conferences